"Say You Will" is a song by British-American rock band Foreigner. It was the first single released from the album Inside Information (1987), and was co-written by Lou Gramm and Mick Jones  (See 1987 in music).

Reception
The single reached No. 6 on the Billboard Hot 100 and became their fourth #1 hit on the Billboard Hot Mainstream Rock Tracks chart, holding the top spot for four weeks, starting on December 19, 1987.

"Say You Will" was one of Foreigner's last two Top 10 chart hits in the United States, followed by the 1988 release of the single "I Don't Want to Live Without You" (which reached No. 5 on the Hot 100 chart). The song also became the band's third-highest-charting hit in Germany, where it reached No. 22, faring even better in Switzerland, the Netherlands, and particularly Norway, where it reached No. 4. The video clip for this song, directed by David Fincher, reached No. 1 on MTV's Top Twenty chart in February 1988.

Allmusic noted that the single was a "good example" of the band's "balancing act" as "the guitar-heavy style of their early work gave way to slick arrangements that pushed electronics to the fore...temper(ing) its rock guitar edge...and Lou Gramm's quasi-operatic vocals...by thick layers of chiming synthesizers and an array of electronic textures."

Cash Box called it a "powerful pop/rock number" with "wide demographic appeal."

It is also featured on the band's compilation 40: Forty Hits From Forty Years 1977-2017 published in 2017, in an acoustic version with Lou Gramm on vocals as a new song.

Track listing

Chart performance

Year-end charts

See also
List of number-one mainstream rock hits (United States)

References

External links
Single release info at discogs.com

Foreigner (band) songs
1987 singles
Songs written by Mick Jones (Foreigner)
Songs written by Lou Gramm
Music videos directed by David Fincher
Atlantic Records singles
Song recordings produced by Mick Jones (Foreigner)